Ali Awad Saleh is an Egyptian judge. He is constitutional adviser to interim president Adly Mansour, and rapporteur to the constitutional amendment committee established in July 2013.

Life
Saleh was the deputy chairman of the Supreme Constitutional Court (SCC). He represented the SCC in the first Constituent Assembly, established to draft a constitution after the 2011 Egyptian revolution. He resigned from the assembly in March 2012, shortly before it was dissolved.

On 5 July 2013 Adly Mansour appointed Saleh as a constitutional advisor. On 20 July Mansour announced a new ten-person constitutional amendment committee, which Saleh would coordinate.

References

Year of birth missing (living people)
Living people
21st-century Egyptian judges